This is a list of the ancient counties of England (excluding Monmouthshire) as recorded by the 1891 census, ordered by their area.

References

1891 United Kingdom census
 
1891 in England